Señorella and the Glass Huarache is a 1964 Warner Bros. Looney Tunes cartoon directed by Hawley Pratt (who also produced the layouts) and written by John W. Dunn. The short was released on August 1, 1964.

The plotline is a typical Cinderella story, but set in Mexico. This was the last Looney Tunes short released before the Warner Bros. Cartoons division was shut down. The studio would reopen for DePatie-Freleng Enterprises and again in 1967 for Warner Bros.-Seven Arts. To most fans, this cartoon's release marks the end of the "classic" era. It was the final one-shot until 1968. Chuck Jones' ending sequence from Now Hear This and Bartholomew Versus the Wheel was used in this cartoon and this was the final cartoon to have this ending sequence.

Plot

At a cantina, a man tells his friend a Mexican version of "Cinderella". Leetle Señorella's "strapmother (stepmother)" and her "strapsiblings" make her do all their dirty work. They won't let her go to Prince Don Jose Miguel's big fiesta, but her fairy godmother comes through with a gorgeous wardrobe and a beautiful "transporte" drawn by a team of mules (formerly cockroaches). At the fiesta, the prince is bored out of his mind while the girls, including Senorella's strapsiblings, dance to impress him and fail miserably. However, he immediately becomes smitten when he sees Señorella. She and Prince Don Jose tango the night away, and his father, Don Miguel, is happy. However at midnight Señorella vamooses, leaving her glass huarache (a Mexican sandal) behind.

Prince Don Jose has every girl in the kingdom try on the glass huarache, hoping to find the mysterious princess he fell in love with. However, none of the girls' feet fit the tiny shoe. Before arriving at the house, the strapmother intentionally tosses a tied up Señorella outside in the mud with the pigs out of fear that she'll be revealed as the mysterious princess and win Don Jose's love. Both her daughters try the shoe, but their feet are too big. Prince Don Jose sees a small foot sticking out from the window and he goes to it. He places the huarache on the foot and it fits. Don Jose sees a pig help Señorella up from the mud and she is revealed to be his mysterious princess. After having her cleaned up, she and Don Jose are married. The man revealed that Señorella's story may have ended happily ever after, but his own story didn't. When his friend asks him what happened to the strapmother and her daughters, the man sadly reveals that he's married to her. This proves to be true as she picks him up and forcibly takes him home.

References

External links
 

Looney Tunes shorts
1964 films
1964 animated films
1964 short films
1960s Warner Bros. animated short films
Films based on Charles Perrault's Cinderella
Films based on Cinderella
Films scored by William Lava
Films set in Mexico
Films directed by Hawley Pratt
1960s English-language films